Carlos Arturo Tejeda Rivera (born July 28, 1980) is a volleyball player from Venezuela, who won the gold medal with the men's national team at the 2003 Pan American Games in Santo Domingo, Dominican Republic playing as a wing-spiker. In the final his team defeated Cuba 3-0 (25-23, 25–18, 25-20).

He won with his team the gold medal at the 2005 Bolivarian Games.

He was born in Distrito Capita, Caracas, Venezuela.

Awards

National Team
 Junior World Championship 1999 Thailand 4 Places

Senior Team
 American Cup Brazil 2000 5 Places
 World League 2002, 2003, 2007, 2008
 2005 Bolivarian Games, -  Gold Medal
 World Championship 2002 Argentina 9 Places
 Center American and Caribbeans Games El Salvador 2002 3 Places
 Pan Americans Games Santo Domingo 2003 Gold Medal
 American Cup Brazil 2005 5 Places
 2005 Bolivarian Games, -  Gold Medal
 World Championship Japan 2006
 Pan Americans Games Brazil 2007 4 Places
 World Cup Japan 2007
 Olympic Games Beijing 2008 China 9 Places
 Center American and Caribbeans Games Puerto Rico 2010 3 Places
 World Championship Italy 2010 12 Places

Foreign Leagues
 Obras Sanitarias San Juan Argentina 2000 - 2001
 Obras Sanitarias San Juan Argentina 2001 - 2002
 Intempo Abanilla Spain 2003 - 2004
 Unicaja Almeria Spain 2005 - 2006
 Reima Crema Italy 2006 - 2007
 AEK Athens Greece 2007
 Al Arabic Qatar 2008
 Maliye Millipiango Turkey 2008 - 2009
 LIG Korea 2009 - 2010
 Al Rayan Qatar 2010 - 2011
 Havash Gombad Iran 2011 - 2012
 Najama Bahrain 2013
 Zahra Lebanon 2014 - 2015
 Obras UDAP San Juan Argentina 2016
 Linares Chile 2017
 Wady Musa Jordan 2017 - 2018

References

External links
 FIVB Profile

1980 births
Living people
Venezuelan men's volleyball players
Volleyball players at the 2008 Summer Olympics
Olympic volleyball players of Venezuela
Volleyball players at the 2003 Pan American Games
Volleyball players at the 2007 Pan American Games
Pan American Games gold medalists for Venezuela
People from Anzoátegui
Pan American Games medalists in volleyball
Medalists at the 2003 Pan American Games
20th-century Venezuelan people
21st-century Venezuelan people